Louder, Please is a play by Norman Krasna, the first of Krasna's plays to be produced on Broadway. It was heavily influenced by The Front Page and also Five Star Final. He wrote it while working as a press agent at Warner Bros. and many of the characters were rumored to be based on real people. Krasna admitted the lead was based on publicity man Hubert Voight and other characters were based on Warners cameraman Buddy Longworth, Bernie Williams and Jack Warner.

The original production was directed by George Abbott and starred Lee Tracy.

The New York Times said "the entertainment spurts out of the direction rather than the play.

It was successful enough for Krasna to be hired as a writer for Columbia Pictures. That studio bought the film rights by March 1932. The film was never made. In March 1962 Edward Buzzell bought the film rights. Again it was not made.

Plot
Publicity men fake the disappearance of a film star.

References

External links

 (archive)
Review of film at Variety

1931 plays
Plays by Norman Krasna
Broadway plays
Plays set in Los Angeles
Hollywood, Los Angeles in fiction